Water polo is a full-contact sport played in many countries around the world. The sport's international governing body is FINA.

Some countries have two principal competitions: a more prestigious league which is typically a double round-robin tournament restricted to the elite clubs, and a cup which is a single-elimination tournament open to both the elite and lesser clubs.

World

Continental governing bodies

Africa

By country

National associations

Competitions and teams
Legend
  – National water polo teams that competed at the Summer Olympics
  – National water polo teams that were Olympic champions
  – National water polo teams that finished in their best ever position of second at the Summer Olympics
  – National water polo teams that finished in their best ever position of third at the Summer Olympics
  – National water polo teams that finished in their best ever position of fourth at the Summer Olympics
  – Hosts of the Summer Olympics

Americas

By country

National associations

Competitions and teams
Legend
  – National water polo teams that competed at the Summer Olympics
  – National water polo teams that were Olympic champions
  – National water polo teams that finished in their best ever position of second at the Summer Olympics
  – National water polo teams that finished in their best ever position of third at the Summer Olympics
  – National water polo teams that finished in their best ever position of fourth at the Summer Olympics
  – Hosts of the Summer Olympics

Asia

By country

National associations
Notes:
 The national associations below are members of the European Swimming League (LEN):
  Armenian Swimming Federation
  Swimming Federation of Azerbaijan
  Cyprus Swimming Federation
  Georgian Aquatic Sports Federation
  Israel Swimming Association
  Russian Water Polo Federation
  Turkish Swimming Federation
 The national association below is a member of the African Swimming Confederation (CANA):
  Egyptian Swimming Federation

Competitions and teams
Legend
  – National water polo teams that competed at the Summer Olympics
  – National water polo teams that were Olympic champions
  – National water polo teams that finished in their best ever position of second at the Summer Olympics
  – National water polo teams that finished in their best ever position of third at the Summer Olympics
  – National water polo teams that finished in their best ever position of fourth at the Summer Olympics
  – Hosts of the Summer Olympics

Europe

By sub-region

By country

National associations
Notes:
 The national association below is a member of the Asia Swimming Federation (AASF):
  Swimming Federation of the Republic of Kazakhstan

Competitions and teams
Legend
  – National water polo teams that competed at the Summer Olympics
  – National water polo teams that were Olympic champions
  – National water polo teams that finished in their best ever position of second at the Summer Olympics
  – National water polo teams that finished in their best ever position of third at the Summer Olympics
  – National water polo teams that finished in their best ever position of fourth at the Summer Olympics
  – Hosts of the Summer Olympics

Oceania

By country

National associations

Competitions and teams
Legend
  – National water polo teams that competed at the Summer Olympics
  – National water polo teams that were Olympic champions
  – National water polo teams that finished in their best ever position of second at the Summer Olympics
  – National water polo teams that finished in their best ever position of third at the Summer Olympics
  – National water polo teams that finished in their best ever position of fourth at the Summer Olympics
  – Hosts of the Summer Olympics

See also
 List of FINA member federations

References

 
 
 
 
 
 
Water polo